David Luke Flatman (born 21 January 1980) is an English sports pundit and former rugby union player who played prop. Flatman represented  eight times between 2000 and 2002, playing club rugby for Saracens and Bath. Flatman is routinely referred to by his nickname Flats.

Career

Early life
Born in Maidstone he started playing rugby union at the age of eight at his local club, Maidstone FC, inspired by his father, who was a prop. A product of Dulwich College, he appeared in the same England Schools (18-group) squad as Steve Borthwick, Andrew Sheridan (also of Dulwich College), Alex Sanderson, Mike Tindall and Jonny Wilkinson.

Flatman toured Australia with England Schools in 1997 and the following year went to Argentina with England Colts. He represented London & South-West and England Under-21s against South Africa in the autumn of 1998.

Senior career
His senior club rugby began with Saracens in 1998.

He made a second tour with the  side to North America in the summer of 2001, appearing as a replacement for Graham Rowntree in the Burnaby and San Francisco Tests against Canada and the United States respectively. He was a regular in the England A side since making his debut against France in Blagnac in 2000. He had a sequence of seven England A team games before being recalled to the senior squad for the final test of the 2000–1 season against France at Twickenham.

He moved to Bath in 2003.

Flatman announced his retirement from rugby in June 2012. In all he won eight England Caps

Media career

Following the end of his playing career, he was Head of Communications at Bath Rugby for two years; he left this role in 2014.

Flatman now works as a pundit for ITV, BT Sport and Amazon Prime often alongside Topsy Ojo. He presents a humorous and informative rugby podcast with his former Saracens teammate Tom Shanklin, called Flats and Shanks. In 2016 the Daily Telegraph named him as the fifth best sports pundit on British TV.

References

External links
Bath profile

1980 births
Living people
Bath Rugby players
England international rugby union players
English rugby union players
People educated at Dulwich College
People educated at Maidstone Grammar School
Rugby union players from Ashford, Kent
Rugby union props
Saracens F.C. players